IcoFX is an icon creation software for Microsoft Windows. Previously a freeware, it allows editing multiple formats of icons with support for transparency. Icons can also be converted from one format to another, for instance from a Macintosh icon to a Windows icon. Users may easily import any image and convert it to an icon. Version 1.6.4 was the last freeware-release of IcoFX. The creator of IcoFX, Attila Kovrig, also developed an animated cursor editor called AniFX in 2008. AniFX's development was discontinued after its features were integrated into IcoFX 2.0.

References

External links
 
 IcoFX Tutorial (German)

Icon software
Portable software
Windows-only shareware
Pascal (programming language) software